The women's singles was an event on the Tennis at the 1900 Summer Olympics program in Paris. It was held from 6 to 11 July at the Île de Puteaux. There were 6 competitors from 4 nations. The event was won by Charlotte Cooper of Great Britain. France's Hélène Prévost was the silver medalist, while American Marion Jones Farquhar and Hedwiga Rosenbaumová of Bohemia are credited with bronze medals. The event made Cooper the first female individual Olympic champion (Hélène de Pourtalès won a gold medal in a team event in sailing earlier; Margaret Abbott would win the women's golf tournament later, in October).

Background

This was the debut appearance of the women's singles tennis. A women's event was held only once during the first three Games (only men's tennis was played in 1896 and 1904), but has been held at every Olympics for which there was a tennis tournament since 1908. Tennis was not a medal sport from 1928 to 1984, though there were demonstration events in 1968 and 1984.

The field for the women's tournament in 1900 was small but distinguished. Great Britain's Charlotte Cooper was a three-time Wimbledon champion (1895, 1896, 1898). France had its best player, Hélène Prévost. Bohemia sent its second-best, Hedwiga Rosenbaumová. Marion Jones Farquhar was the U.S. champion in 1899 (and would be again in 1902). (Her sister Georgina Jones also competed.)

Competition format

The competition was a single-elimination tournament with no bronze-medal match (both semifinal losers tied for third). All matches were best-of-three sets.

Schedule

Draw

Draw

Results summary

References

External links
  ITF, 2008 Olympic Tennis Event Media Guide

Women's singles
1900 in women's tennis
1900 in French women's sport
Tenn